Kevin Joseph Carmody (5 May 1925 – 9 September 2009) was an Australian cricket umpire. He stood in two ODI games between 1979 and 1980.

See also
 List of One Day International cricket umpires

References

1925 births
2009 deaths
Australian One Day International cricket umpires
Sportspeople from Melbourne
People from Elsternwick, Victoria